Dunika Parish is an administrative unit of South Kurzeme Municipality, Latvia. The parish has a population of 749 (as of 1/07/2010) and covers an area of 210.5 km2.

Villages of Dunika Parish

External links 

Parishes of Latvia
South Kurzeme Municipality
Courland